"Squeeze Me In" is a song written by Delbert McClinton and Gary Nicholson. It was recorded by Lee Roy Parnell for his 1995 album We All Get Lucky Sometimes, and was the B-side to his 1996 single "Givin' Water to a Drowning Man".

It was recorded by American country music artists Garth Brooks and Trisha Yearwood. It was released in February 2002 as the third single from Brooks' album Scarecrow.  The song reached number 16 on the Billboard Hot Country Singles & Tracks chart.

Brooks and Yearwood's version was nominated at the Grammy Awards for Best Country Collaboration with Vocals.

Music video
The music video was directed by Jon Small and premiered in early 2002. It is a live performance video.

Chart performance

References

2002 singles
1995 songs
Garth Brooks songs
Trisha Yearwood songs
Male–female vocal duets
Song recordings produced by Allen Reynolds
Lee Roy Parnell songs
Capitol Records Nashville singles
Songs written by Gary Nicholson
Songs written by Delbert McClinton